The Arab Clubs Champions Championship is a sport competition for club Water polo teams, organized by the Arab water polo Association.

Results

By Club

By Country

References

External links
 Arab Clubs Champions Championship 
 Arab Clubs Champions Championship  

Arab
Water polo competitions in Africa
Water polo competitions in Asia